Kathleen Gill Atkinson (November 5, 1875 – April 30, 1957) was an American tennis player.

With her older sister, Juliette, both residents of Maplewood, she won the US Women's National Championship in women's doubles 1897 and 1898. They were the first sisters to win a title together and the first to play each other in a semi final until the Williams sisters played in the final.

Grand Slam finals

Doubles (2 titles)

References

1875 births
1957 deaths
19th-century American women
19th-century female tennis players
American female tennis players
People from Maplewood, New Jersey
Sportspeople from Essex County, New Jersey
Tennis people from New Jersey
United States National champions (tennis)
Grand Slam (tennis) champions in women's doubles